Richard Owens (4 January 1840 – 1909) was a Catholic priest in the Diocese of Clogher, Ireland. 

Dr. Owens was born in Clogher, County Tyrone. He was born at Aghavea on 4 January 1840; and educated at St Macartan's College, Monaghan and St Patrick's College, Maynooth. After curacies at Maguiresbridge and Donagh he was on the staff of St Patrick's, Maynooth. Later he served as Dean and Professor of Dogmatic Theology in Maynooth College.

He was appointed the Roman Catholic Bishop of Clogher on 6 July 1894, following the death of his predecessor, James Donnelly. He was ordained that same year. 
Bishop Owens was a supporter of the Gaelic League and other Nationalist campaigns.

He died in office in 1909 having served as bishop of his diocese for almost fifteen years. Owens was succeeded by as bishop by Patrick McKenna.

References

1840 births
1909 deaths
Roman Catholic bishops of Clogher
People from County Tyrone
19th-century Roman Catholic bishops in Ireland
20th-century Roman Catholic bishops in Ireland
Alumni of St Patrick's College, Maynooth
People educated at St Macartan's College, Monaghan